Kwasi Kyei Darkwah popularly known as KKD (born December 19, 1965 is a Ghanaian broadcaster, Master of Ceremonies, media, culture and tourism expert.

Early life

KKD was born on 19 December 1965 in Tema to Opanin Kwasi Darkwah and Ohemaa Ama Asokwa Kyei Darkwah of royal lineage.

Education

Darkwah holds a Master of Arts Degree in Audio-Visual Production (Film & Television) from London Metropolitan University, a Diploma in Journalism from Ghana Institute of Journalism, a Certificate in Marketing Management from Ghana Institute of Management and Public Administration, a Certificate in Production and Cost Management from the Association of Overseas Technical Scholarship of Japan, a Certificate in Marketing Management from Ghana Institute of Management and Public Administration, and a Certificate in Delivering Learning to Adults from [Westminster Adult Education Service, London. He had his second cycle education at Ghana's prestigious second cycle institution, Presbyterian Boys' Secondary School - Legon (PRESEC), Accra.

Career

KKD started as a broadcast journalist at the Ghana Broadcasting Corporation. He has held positions including Director of Public Communications at the Ghana Investment Promotion Council, Director of Programmes & Marketing at Sunshine Radio, General Manager of record company Megastar Limited, Account Manager for Corporate Healthcare at Gissings Consultancy Services in London. He also was Advertising & Promotions Manager at ABC Brewery Ltd.

Rape charge

He was arrested on 27 December 2014 following a report accusing him of raping a 19-year-old woman in the bathroom of the African Regent Hotel in Accra, Ghana. He was formally charged with rape.

On 12 January 2015, the 19-year-old alleged victim expressed her disinterest in pursuing the case. Darwkah was freed and the rape charge against him was dropped on 22 April 2015 after the Attorney General entered a nolle prosequi for the case.

See also
Kojo Antwi
Kofi Okyere Darko

References

Living people
1966 births
Ghanaian broadcasters
Presbyterian Boys' Senior High School alumni